Cuajada (milk curd) is a cheese product traditionally made from sheep's milk, but now it is more often made industrially from cow's milk. It is popular in the northern regions of Spain (Asturias, Basque Country, Navarre, Aragon, Castile and Leon, and La Rioja). In Latin America, it is popular in Colombia and in the Central American countries of El Salvador, Honduras, Nicaragua and in the northern region of Costa Rica. 

Raw warmed milk is mixed with rennet or plant extracts and left to curdle. It was traditionally made in a wooden vessel called kaiku and heated with a red-hot poker, giving it a distinct faintly burned taste. Cuajada means "curdled" in Spanish. In Basque, it is called mamia.

Cuajada is usually served as dessert with honey and walnuts or sometimes sugar, and less often, for breakfast with fruit or honey. In Colombia, it is typically served with melado, a thick syrup made of panela. In Nicaragua, salt is usually added to the cuajada, which is eaten with güirilas and other dishes

Coalhada
A similar product named coalhada, Portuguese for "curdled", is found mostly in Brazil, especially in rural areas, where traditional recipes are more common. It is made from curdled milk (specifically from putting acidic plant-based substances such as lemon juice, other citrus juice, or vinegar into boiled milk, mainly from cattle or goats) and yogurt. Recipes vary, but usually contain sugar and/or fruit juices for sweetness.

See also
List of Brazilian dishes
List of dairy products
Junket

References

Dairy products
Basque cuisine
Brazilian desserts
Nicaraguan cuisine
Salvadoran cuisine
Honduran cuisine